The women's allround combination of the 2015–16 ISU Speed Skating World Cup 5, arranged in the Sørmarka Arena in Stavanger, Norway, was contested on 29–31 January 2016. It was the only allround combination competition of the 2015–16 World Cup.

The contest included each skater's time from the 1500 metres and 3000 metres competitions that were raced during the weekend. Martina Sáblíková of the Czech Republic had the best combined result, while Dutch skaters Ireen Wüst and Linda de Vries came in second and third place.

Results

References

Women allround combination
5